Othonocheirodus eigenmanni is a species of characin endemic to Peru, where it is found in the Amazon River basin. This species is the only member of its genus.

References

Characidae
Monotypic fish genera
Fish of South America
Fish of Peru
Fish described in 1927